The Electronic Text Corpus of Sumerian Literature (ETCSL) was a project that provides an online digital library of texts and translations of Sumerian literature.

This project's website contains "Sumerian text, English prose translation and bibliographical information" for "over 400 literary works composed in the Sumerian language in ancient Mesopotamia (modern Iraq) during the late third and early second millennia BCE." It is both browsable and searchable and includes transliterations, composite texts, a bibliography of Sumerian literature and a guide to spelling conventions for proper nouns and literary forms. The purpose of the project was to make Sumerian literature accessible to those wishing to read or study it, and make it known to a wider public.

The project was founded by Jeremy Black in 1997 and is based at the Oriental Institute of the University of Oxford in Britain. It was funded by the University along with the Leverhulme Trust and the Arts and Humanities Research Board. Various other bodies have been involved in the project including All Souls College, Oxford, the British Academy, the Hungarian Scientific Research Fund (OTKA) and the Hungarian Academy of Sciences. Contributors to the project have included Graham Cunningham, Eleanor Robson, Gabor Zolyomi, Miguel Civil, Bendt Alster, Joachim Krecher and Piotr Michalowski. Other libraries from the University of Chicago and the University of Pennsylvania now usually follow the ETCSL in regards to abbreviations. Funding for the project ended and it was closed in 2006, but the web site remains available.

Publications
 J.A. Black, et al., The Literature of Ancient Sumer, Oxford University Press, 2004. .
 J. Ebeling and G. Cunningham (eds.), Analysing Literary Sumerian: Corpus-Based Approaches, London: Equinox, 2007. .

References

External links
ETCSL website
ETCSL General Information

Projects established in 1997
Projects disestablished in 2006
Research projects
British digital libraries
Archaeological databases
Literature websites
Culture of the University of Oxford
Cuneiform
Sumerian literature
Electronic Text Corpus of Sumerian Literature